Pharyngula, a blog founded and written by PZ Myers, is hosted on ScienceBlogs (2005–2011, in full, and 2011–present, in part) and on FreeThoughtBlogs (2011–present). In 2006 the science journal Nature listed it as the top-ranked blog written by a scientist based on popularity.  The blog addresses a range of topics, including Myers's academic specialty, biology. It has become particularly well known for Myers's writing style (characterized by sarcasm) and for his criticism of intelligent design and creationism.  In 2009, Hemant Mehta ranked Pharyngula the most popular atheist blog, based on subscriber levels and other factors.

History

According to Alexa Internet, Pharyngula.org was started on June 19, 2002.  It started out as an experiment in writing instruction for a class. Students were required to submit mini-essays to be published online. After the project was finished, Myers still had the web-publishing software, and started to use it personally. The blog is named after his favourite stage in embryonic development, the pharyngula stage. Pharyngula moved to hosting at ScienceBlogs in 2005.

In 2007, Myers reviewed Stuart Pivar's book Lifecode, which argues that self-organization at the embryonic and fetal stages determines the development and final structure of organisms. Myers reviewed the book negatively, stating that the diagrams and ideas in the book arose from Pivar's imagination and had no basis in actual evidence. After some discussion in the comments threads of Pharyngula, Pivar sued Myers for libel. Within a week Pivar withdrew the lawsuit, stating that "the real issue got sidelined" and that his problem was more with Seed Media Group.

In June 2008, Myers commented on national press reports that a University of Central Florida student took a host (Eucharist wafer) from a Catholic Mass in response to forcible attempts to stop him from carrying it back to his seat, where he claimed he planned to show it to a fellow student who was curious about the Catholic faith. After death threats were directed against the student by some who were offended by the student's behavior, Myers composed his first blog post on the topic.

	 
After describing the harassment leveled against the student, he asked readers to acquire for him consecrated Eucharistic hosts, which he might "show you sacrilege, gladly, and with much fanfare" and could treat "with profound disrespect and heinous cracker abuse, all photographed and presented here on the web." Bill Donohue's Catholic League responded with a letter demanding the University of Minnesota and the Minnesota State Legislature take action against Myers.  Proponents of this action noted that Myers's blog could be reached from his university web page. Myers has received several death threats and much hate mail over the controversy.

In August 2011, Myers and others founded a new blog network, FreethoughtBlogs, to host Pharyngula and other blogs in the atheist/secular field.  According to Myers, the move was made as an "acceptable compromise" between him and National Geographic, who at that time would be "taking a more active role in hosting the ScienceBlogs stable" and therefore "bringing their standards & practices, which are different from the more freewheeling policies of Seed Media [and would cause] a culture clash". Myers stated that "NatGeo and I have worked out an acceptable compromise. This site on Freethoughtblogs […is not] in any way associated with National Geographic" and that he would only cross-post to his original site on ScienceBlogs "whatever I write that I feel is compatible with the more conservative ethos of National Geographic." As such, since August 2011, the complete Pharyngula has appeared on FreethoughtBlogs, and a limited selection of those posts – the more science-focused ones – are cross-posted to the ScienceBlogs-hosted version.

In September 2012, Myers announced that blogger and environmentalist Chris Clarke would become Pharyngula's co-author. Clarke left the blog in August 2013, partly because of the perceived unpleasantness of Pharyngula commenters

Content

Myers often criticizes intelligent design, creationism and pseudoscientific movements, and posts on subjects such as science, religion, politics, superstition, and education. His experience in evolutionary developmental biology and as a teacher provides depth to the subjects of science and education. One theme that arises regularly is that of cephalopods, creatures that Myers finds quite fascinating.

Creationism

In particular Myers frequently  offers specific criticisms of creationism, including intelligent design as well as the Discovery Institute, Answers in Genesis, and other groups that promote pseudoscientific ideas. For example, in February and March 2007, he focused many of his posts on creationist neurosurgeon Michael Egnor, who had recently joined the Discovery Institute. In addition to Myers's criticisms of Egnor's arguments on evolution and Intelligent Design, Myers criticized the Discovery Institute's reliance on someone whose expertise wasn't relevant to evolution.

In early April 2007, Myers participated in an April Fool's Day joke arranged by The Panda's Thumb which manufactured a website spoofing the Discovery Institute's page on which "Egnor" admitted that his association with the Discovery Institute was itself an April Fool's joke. This elaborate prank succeeded in fooling many of his readers, while others succeeded in spotting jokes in the design of the false Discovery Institute page and concluded that this admission was itself the prank. He made a point the following day that he perceived it as getting exceedingly difficult to believe some creationists were for real (cf. Poe's Law) and highlighted a quote by Stephen Meyer.

Memes

"Pygmies and dwarfs"
In June 2005, Myers criticized a cartoon by biblical literalist Jim Pinkoski which claimed that the biblical line, "There were giants in the earth in those days," (Genesis 6:4) was literally intended to convey that early humans were much taller than their modern counterparts. What Myers found most interesting about this cartoon, however, was the note on it which read, literally, "NOTE: If you doubt this is possible, how is it there are PYGMIES + DWARFS ??".

If Pinkoski's claims were valid, humans would perhaps continue to decrease in height and approach that small size at some time in the future, but this does not mean those small humans would exist now (barring the use of time travel, a claim Pinkoski never makes). Myers went on to mock the irrelevance of this argument with parodies such as:

Ever wonder how the hell a moron like George W. Bush got elected? "If you doubt this is possible, how is it there are PYGMIES + DWARFS??".
How can people be so gullible to believe the nonsense peddled by the Discovery Institute? "If you doubt this is possible, how is it there are PYGMIES + DWARFS??".

The phrase has since been picked up by various bloggers to ridicule creationist arguments, and is also popular with commenters at The Panda's Thumb. The phrase is generally capitalized and bolded to match how it originally appeared in Pinkoski's cartoon.

The courtier's reply

Myers has voiced the position that many of the responses to Richard Dawkins's The God Delusion are what he calls "Courtier's Replies".  Replying to critics who felt that Dawkins ignored sophisticated versions of modern theology, Myers compared them to courtiers fawning on the legendary emperor who had no clothes:

In other words, critics complain about Dawkins not studying aspects of theology that are irrelevant to whether or not God exists in the same way as scholarly writings about imperial fashion are irrelevant when the emperor is naked. Dawkins himself quoted the Courtier's Reply in a debate with Alister McGrath.  He also referenced the Courtier's Reply in the preface to The God Delusion's 2007 paperback edition.

Blake's Law
Another recurring trope has been Myers's reaction to the label "fundamentalist atheist", bestowed by some upon him, Dawkins and others who espouse similar views.  Myers writes,
The "new atheism" (I don't like that phrase, either) is about taking a core set of principles that have proven themselves powerful and useful in the scientific world — you've probably noticed that many of these uppity atheists are coming out of a scientific background — and insisting that they also apply to everything else people do. These principles are a reliance on natural causes and demanding explanations in terms of the real world, with a documentary chain of evidence, that anyone can examine. The virtues are critical thinking, flexibility, openness, verification, and evidence. The sins are dogma, faith, tradition, revelation, superstition, and the supernatural. There is no holy writ, and a central idea is that everything must be open to rational, evidence-based criticism — it's the opposite of fundamentalism.
Eventually, Myers summarized his stance by invoking "Blake's Law", named for Pharyngula commentator Blake Stacey. As formulated by Stacey in 2007, based in concept on Godwin's Law: "In any discussion of atheism (skepticism, etc.), the probability that someone will compare a vocal atheist to religious fundamentalists increases to one."

"Deep rifts"
Myers has made frequent use of the phrase "deep rifts" to satirize perceptions that atheism could experience a religious schism over disagreements on marketing atheism or the role of science and religion. Myers does not deny there are some differences of opinion between prominent atheists, but contends this is a good thing and is attributed to the freethinking nature of atheism.

See also
Creation–evolution controversy
Popular science
Scientific skepticism

References

External links
 Pharyngula at FreethoughtBlogs
 Pharyngula at ScienceBlogs
 

Science blogs
American blogs
Biology websites
Criticism of creationism
Criticism of intelligent design
Scientific skepticism mass media
Internet properties established in 2002